The Albanian Basketball Cup, is the top annual national basketball cup competition in Albania. It was created in 1951 by the Albanian Basketball Association and the sides with the most titles are Tirana, who have won the competition on 19 occasions.

Title holders

 1951: Partizani
 1952: Garnizoni Tiranë
 1956: BC Puna Durrës
 1957: Vllaznia
 1958: Vllaznia
 1960: Partizani
 1961: Tirana
 1962: Tirana
 1963: Tirana
 1965: Lokomotiva Durrës
 1966: Vllaznia
 1967: Vllaznia
 1968: Vllaznia
 1969: 17 Nëntori
 1970: Partizani
 1971: 17 Nëntori
 1972: Partizani
 1973: 17 Nëntori
 1974: Dinamo
 1975: Partizani
 1976: Partizani
 1977: 17 Nëntori
 1978: Partizani
 1979: Dinamo
 1980: Partizani
 1981: Vllaznia
 1982: Partizani
 1983: Partizani (*)
 1984: Partizani
 1985: Vllaznia
 1986: Dinamo
 1987: Partizani
 1988: 17 Nëntori
 1989: Partizani
 1990: Partizani
 1991: Dinamo
 1992: Dinamo
 1993: Dinamo
 1994: Vllaznia
 1995: Partizani
 1996: Vllaznia
 1997: Studenti
 1998: Vllaznia (*)
 1999: Dinamo
 2000: Tirana
 2001: Tirana (*)
 2002: Tirana 
 2003: Valbona
 2003–04: Valbona
 2004–05: Valbona
 2005–06: Valbona
 2006–07: Tirana 
 2007–08: Tirana 
 2008–09: Tirana 
 2009–10: Studenti
 2010–11: Tirana 
 2011–12: Tirana 
 2012–13: Kamza Basket
 2013–14: Vllaznia
 2014–15: Vllaznia
 2015–16: Kamza Basket
 2016–17: Tirana
 2017–18: Tirana
 2018–19: Teuta
 2019–20: Goga Basket
 2020–21: Teuta
 2021–22: Tirana
 2022–23: Teuta

Finals

Performance by club

References

1
Basketball cup competitions in Europe
1951 establishments in Albania